Jaddangi is a village in Rajavommangi Mandal, Alluri Sitharama Raju district in the state of Andhra Pradesh in India.

Geography 

Demographics 
 India census, Jaddangi had a population of 3,573, out of which 1,794 were male and 1,779 were female. The population of children below 6 years of age was 8%. The literacy rate of the village was 61%.

References 

Villages in Rajavommangi mandal